Mark William Douglas (born 20 October 1968) is a former international cricketer. Born in Nelson, New Zealand, Douglas played six One Day Internationals for New Zealand. He also played for Nelson in the Hawke Cup.

References

1968 births
Living people
New Zealand cricketers
New Zealand One Day International cricketers
Central Districts cricketers
Wellington cricketers
People educated at Waimea College
North Island cricketers